Brendan Peter Schaub (born March 18, 1983) is an American podcast host, former professional mixed martial artist, and stand-up comedian. He is the host of The Fighter and the Kid podcast, the Below the Belt with Brendan Schaub podcast, and co-host of the Golden Hour podcast, along with fellow comedians Chris D'Elia and Erik Griffin. After signing with Ultimate Fighting Championship (UFC) in 2009 to compete on The Ultimate Fighter, he fought for the company until 2014. He officially retired from mixed martial arts (MMA) in 2015. Since 2015, Schaub has been performing stand-up comedy, initially as a duo act with comedian Bryan Callen, but more recently as a solo comedian. Schaub released his debut comedy special titled You'd Be Surprised in 2019 followed by his second special,The Gringo Papi in 2022.

Early life and education
Schaub was born and raised in Aurora, Colorado, to an English mother Debra and an American father Peter Schaub. He is of German, Italian, and English descent. His father is a second-degree black belt in taekwondo. While at Overland High School, Schaub lettered two years varsity lacrosse and one year varsity American football. He received no college athletic scholarship offers but he tried out for both the football team and lacrosse team at Whittier College and was accepted to both. Prior to his junior year, he transferred to the University of Colorado to play football full-time where he redshirted his first season. Following college, Schaub went undrafted in the 2006 NFL Draft but would be signed with the Arena Football League's Utah Blaze, before being released in November 2006 without making the roster. He was once more signed to the Blaze in February 2007 but waived two days later. Schaub then retired from the sport in 2007.

Mixed martial arts career

Early career
After retiring from football, Schaub returned to Colorado where he began training in boxing and Brazilian jiu-jitsu. After only six months of training in boxing, Schaub competed in amateur boxing and won the Colorado novice-division Golden Gloves heavyweight title. Schaub later began training at High Altitude Martial Arts located in Aurora and the Grudge Training Center in Arvada, where he met UFC heavyweight contender Shane Carwin. The two became friends as well as training partners. After this, he began his professional career in mixed martial arts (MMA), mainly competing in Colorado. Schaub started his career with a 4–0 record and won the heavyweight title for the Ring of Fire organization.

Ultimate Fighting Championship

The Ultimate Fighter
In 2009, Schaub signed with Ultimate Fighting Championship (UFC) to compete on the tenth season of The Ultimate Fighter. Schaub was the number two pick for coach Rashad. In his first fight on the show, he faced Demico Rogers, defeating him via first round submission with an anaconda choke to move onto the quarter-finals.

In the quarter-finals, Schaub won his fight by KO (punch) in the second round against Jon Madsen.

In the semi-finals, Schaub defeated Marcus Jones via KO (punches) in the first round.

Schaub made his official UFC debut when he faced Roy Nelson at The Ultimate Fighter: Heavyweights Finale. Schaub lost via KO (punch) in the first round.

UFC Heavyweight division
In his second UFC bout, Schaub had a 47-second TKO (punches) win over Chase Gormley at UFC Live: Vera vs. Jones.

Schaub next fought Chris Tuchscherer at UFC 116. Schaub won the bout via TKO (punches) in the first round.

Schaub would then face Gabriel Gonzaga at UFC 121. Schaub won via unanimous decision (30–27, 30–27, and 30–27).

Schaub and Frank Mir were tentatively booked for a contest at UFC 128 on March 19, 2011. However, Schaub instead faced Mirko Cro Cop at the event. Schaub won the contest via third-round KO (punch) and was awarded the Knockout of the Night bonus.

On August 27, 2011, at UFC 134, Schaub lost to Antônio Rodrigo Nogueira via KO (punches) in the first round.

He lost his second straight fight, also via KO (punches) to Ben Rothwell on April 21, 2012, at UFC 145.

Schaub was expected to face Lavar Johnson on December 8, 2012, at UFC on Fox 5. However, Johnson was forced out of the bout with a groin injury and Schaub was pulled from the card as well. Schaub fought Johnson on February 23, 2013, at UFC 157. Schaub won via unanimous decision (30–27, 30–27, and 30–27). After, it was announced Johnson tested positive for elevated testosterone in a post-fight drug test.

Schaub was expected to face Matt Mitrione on July 27, 2013, at UFC on Fox 8. However, in mid-July, Mitrione pulled out of the bout citing an injury and Schaub was pulled from the event as well. The bout eventually took place on September 21, 2013, at UFC 165. Schaub defeated Mitrione in the first round via D'Arce choke.

Schaub fought returning former UFC heavyweight champion Andrei Arlovski at UFC 174 on June 14, 2014, with Arlovski winning via split decision.

On December 6, 2014, at UFC 181, Schaub lost via TKO (punches) in the first round to Travis Browne. 
Days after the fight, Schaub's friend and UFC commentator Joe Rogan had a joint podcast with Schaub and Bryan Callen where Rogan and Callen advised Schaub to retire from MMA and pursue a career in comedy.

On October 10, 2015, Schaub was a guest on The Joe Rogan Experience podcast and announced his retirement from MMA.

Despite having retired from MMA, Schaub continued training in Brazilian Jiu-Jitsu. On May 29, 2021, was promoted to the rank of black belt in the sport.

Championships and accomplishments

Amateur boxing
Golden Gloves
Colorado Heavyweight Golden Gloves (2008)

Mixed martial arts
Ring of Fire
Ring of Fire Heavyweight Championship (One time)
Ultimate Fighting Championship
Knockout of the Night (One time)

Mixed martial arts record

|-
| Loss
|align=center| 10–5
| Travis Browne
| TKO (punches)
| UFC 181
| 
|align=center| 1
|align=center| 4:50
| Las Vegas, Nevada, United States
|
|-
| Loss
|align=center| 10–4
| Andrei Arlovski
| Decision (split)
| UFC 174
| 
|align=center| 3
|align=center| 5:00
| Vancouver, British Columbia, Canada
|
|-
| Win
|align=center| 10–3
| Matt Mitrione
| Technical Submission (D'Arce choke)
| UFC 165
| 
|align=center| 1
|align=center| 4:06
| Toronto, Ontario, Canada
| 
|-
| Win
|align=center| 9–3
| Lavar Johnson
| Decision (unanimous)
| UFC 157
| 
|align=center| 3
|align=center| 5:00
| Anaheim, California, United States
| 
|-
| Loss
|align=center| 8–3
| Ben Rothwell
| KO (punches)
| UFC 145
| 
|align=center| 1
|align=center| 1:10
| Atlanta, Georgia, United States
| 
|-
| Loss
|align=center| 8–2
| Antônio Rodrigo Nogueira
| KO (punches)
| UFC 134
| 
|align=center| 1
|align=center| 3:09
| Rio de Janeiro, Brazil
| 
|-
| Win
|align=center| 8–1
| Mirko Cro Cop
| KO (punch)
| UFC 128
| 
|align=center| 3
|align=center| 3:44
| Newark, New Jersey, United States
| 
|-
| Win
|align=center| 7–1
| Gabriel Gonzaga
| Decision (unanimous)
| UFC 121
| 
|align=center| 3
|align=center| 5:00
| Anaheim, California, United States
| 
|-
| Win
|align=center| 6–1
| Chris Tuchscherer
| TKO (punches)
| UFC 116
| 
|align=center| 1
|align=center| 1:07
| Paradise, Nevada, United States
| 
|-
| Win
|align=center| 5–1
| Chase Gormley
| TKO (punches)
| UFC Live: Vera vs. Jones
| 
|align=center| 1
|align=center| 0:47
| Broomfield, Colorado, United States
| 
|-
| Loss
|align=center| 4–1
| Roy Nelson
| KO (punch)
| The Ultimate Fighter: Heavyweights Finale
| 
|align=center| 1
|align=center| 3:45
| Paradise, Nevada, United States
| 
|-
| Win
|align=center| 4–0
| Bojan Spalević
| TKO (punches)
| ROF 34 - Judgment Day
| 
|align=center| 1
|align=center| 0:52
| Broomfield, Colorado, United States
| 
|-
| Win
|align=center| 3–0
| Alex Rozman
| TKO (punches)
| ROF 33 - Adrenaline
| 
|align=center| 1
|align=center| 1:23
| Broomfield, Colorado, United States
|
|- 
| Win
|align=center| 2–0
| Johnny Curtis
| KO (punches)
| UWC: Confrontation
| 
|align=center| 1
|align=center| 1:07
| George Mason, Virginia, United States
| 
|-
| Win
|align=center| 1–0
| Jay Lester
| TKO (punches)
| ROF 32 - Respect
| 
|align=center| 1
|align=center| 0:30
| Broomfield, Colorado, United States
|

|-
|Win
|align=center|3–0
|Marcus Jones
|KO (punches)
|rowspan=3|The Ultimate Fighter: Heavyweights
|
|align=center|1
|align=center|2:11
|rowspan=3|Paradise, Nevada, United States
|
|-
|Win
|align=center|2–0
|Jon Madsen
|KO (punch)
|
|align=center|2
|align=center|1:39
|
|-
|Win
|align=center|1–0
|Demico Rogers
|Submission (anaconda choke)
|
|align=center|1
|align=center|3:17
|
|-

Entertainment career

Podcasting 
In 2013, Schaub and Bryan Callen started their podcast titled The Fighter and the Kid. The shows were produced by FOX network until a contract dispute in 2016. They then left the network and began producing the podcast themselves. Schaub and Callen also began touring to perform shows that were a mix between a live podcast and duo stand-up comedy act.

In December 2016, Schaub launched a solo podcast, titled Big Brown Breakdown. The podcast focuses on topics related to combat sports, mainly mixed martial arts.

On the January 30 episode of Big Brown Breakdown, Schaub generated controversy when he suggested that the UFC On Fox panel of presenters had been selected based on race for the sake of diversity. "Sometimes you look at UFC Tonight and you're like, 'Alright, is that the best panel possible? Or are you just trying to check off the boxes?'" Schaub questioned. "We get it, UFC Tonight FOX, you're not racist. We get it, you have an all-black panel. We get it. Woah, we get it. We get it, man."

In February 2018, Schaub partnered with Showtime to rebrand his solo podcast to the name "BELOW THE BELT with Brendan Schaub". They also released a web show of the same name where Schaub would serve as the host.

On December 21, 2018, Schaub and Theo Von announced the creation of a new podcast titled "King and the Sting". On January 13, 2022, Schaub and Von added Chris D'Elia to the podcast, renaming it to "King and the Sting and Wing".

On November 4, 2022, "King and the Sting and Wing" was officially renamed "The Golden Hour", with Erik Griffin Replacing Theo Von.

Stand-up comedy 

After retiring from mixed martial arts in 2014, Schaub began pursuing a stand-up comedy career. At first, he toured and performed with Bryan Callen until August 10, 2016, when he debuted as a solo comedian at The Comedy Store in Los Angeles, California. In January 2019 Brendan Schaub filmed his first ever Showtime comedy special titled, "You'd Be Surprised", which debuted on May 18, 2019. Schaub released his second comedy special available through streaming on YouTube titled "The Gringo Papi" on April 28, 2022.

Television and film 
In 2016, Schaub and Callen released a sketch comedy series on iTunes titled The Fighter and the Kid 3D.

Schaub made his feature film debut in the 2016 movie Range 15.

In 2017, Schaub was brought on by Showtime for commentary and analysis surrounding the Mayweather/McGregor boxing match alongside Mauro Ranallo, Paulie Malignaggi, and Brian Custer

In 2018, Schaub began working for E! Entertainment news co-hosting the after-shows of the Golden Globes, Academy Awards, Emmy Awards, People's Choice Awards, and Grammy Awards. Also in 2018, Schaub began serving as a panelist for the television show Bravo's Play-By-Play on Bravo network. Schaub made his second feature film appearance in the 2020 David Ayer movie The Tax Collector.

Endorsements 
During his fighting career Schaub had sponsors. Notably Big Rentals Construction Company, KeepItPlayful.com, the Reign Training Center, Box N Burn Gym, Soul Electronics, Alchemist Management.

Filmography

Personal life
Schaub is engaged to long-time girlfriend Joanna Zanella and they have two sons, born in 2016 and 2019. He has one brother named Jay. Schaub previously had a brief relationship with Ronda Rousey. He supports sports teams of Denver, Colorado, and Los Angeles, California, as well as the Cleveland Browns. Schaub is an avid fan of fashion and automobiles. According to Schaub, after getting a broken nose in his fight with Mirko Cro Cop, he was prescribed oxycontin for recovery and spent months addicted to them. In May 2021, Schaub was promoted to black belt in Brazilian jiu-jitsu after 14 years of training.

See also
 List of male mixed martial artists

References

External links

Official UFC Profile

1983 births
Living people
American lacrosse players
American male comedians
American male mixed martial artists
American people of English descent
American people of German descent
American people of Italian descent
American practitioners of Brazilian jiu-jitsu
American stand-up comedians
Colorado Buffaloes football players
Heavyweight mixed martial artists
Mixed martial artists utilizing boxing
Mixed martial artists utilizing wrestling
Mixed martial artists utilizing Brazilian jiu-jitsu
Mixed martial artists from Colorado
Sportspeople from Aurora, Colorado
People awarded a black belt in Brazilian jiu-jitsu
Utah Blaze players
Ultimate Fighting Championship male fighters